Gertrude Anna Bertha Hermes  (18 August 1901 – 9 May 1983) was a British wood-engraver and sculptor. Hermes was a member of the English Wood Engraving Society (1925–31) and exhibited with the Society of Wood Engravers, the Royal Academy and The London Group during the 1930s.

Life
Gertrude Anna Bertha Hermes was born on 18 August 1901 in Bickley, Kent. Her parents, Louis August Hermes and Helene, née Gerdes, were from Altena, near Dortmund, Germany. In about 1921 she attended the Beckenham School of Art, and in 1922 enrolled at Leon Underwood's Brook Green School of Painting and Sculpture, where other students included Eileen Agar, Raymond Coxon, Henry Moore and Blair Hughes-Stanton, whom she married in 1926; they separated in 1931, and were divorced in 1933.

Hermes was a contributor to the short-lived publication, Island (1931) that was edited by Joseph Bard. She was also a commissioned illustrator for Penguin Books.

Hermes exhibited regularly at the Royal Academy from 1934, and showed at the Venice International Exhibition in 1939. In 1937, Hermes produced a commission for the British Pavilion at the Paris World Fair. She lived and worked in the US and Canada from 1940 to 1945. On her return to England she taught wood engraving and linocutting at the Central School of Art in London (now Central St Martin's) in the late 1940s to early '50s. She also took a drawing class to London Zoo. She taught wood and lino block printing at the Royal Academy Schools, from 1966.

In 1949, Hermes was elected an associate of the Royal Society of Painter-Etchers and Engravers. She was elected Associate of the Royal Academy in 1963 and a full Royal Academician in 1971. In 1961, she was awarded first prize in the Giles Bequest competition at the Victoria and Albert Museum for her linocut Stonehenge. She was appointed an OBE in 1981.

Her work is in many public collections including the Tate, and the National Portrait Gallery. Her work was also in private collections including a c1926 bronze "Swallow" door knocker in the collection of David Bowie.

Hermes suffered severe stroke in 1969 that meant she was unable to work. She died in Bristol in 1983.

Notable works
 Spring bouquet, 1929, wood engraving
 Leda and the Swan, 1932, sculpture
 The warrior's tomb, 1941, wood engraving
 Bat and Spider, 1932, wood engraving
 Other Cats and Henry, 1952, wood engraving
 Kathleen Raine, 1954, sculpture
 Peacock, 1961, bronze sculpture, for Ordsall High School in Salford

Exhibitions
 1967 Bronzes and Carvings, Drawings, Wood Engravings, Wood and Lino Block Cuts, 1924–1967 Whitechapel Art Gallery
 2008 North House Gallery
 2015 - 2016 Wild Girl: Gertrude Hermes The Hepworth Wakefield. First UK retrospective of Hermes's work in 30 years.

References

External links 

 Profile on Royal Academy of Arts Collections

1901 births
1983 deaths
20th-century British sculptors
20th-century British printmakers
20th-century English women artists
English people of German descent
English printmakers
English wood engravers
English women sculptors
Officers of the Order of the British Empire
People from Bickley
Royal Academicians
Women engravers
20th-century engravers